Doumergue's fringe-fingered lizard (Acanthodactylus spinicauda), also known commonly as Doumergue's fringe-toed lizard, is a species of lizard in the family Lacertidae.

Geographic range
A. spinicauda is found in Algeria.

Habitat
The natural habitats of A. spinicauda are open stony and flat sandy places.

Reproduction
A. spinicauda is oviparous, and the average clutch size is 8 eggs.

Conservation status
The species A. spinicauda is considered "Critically Endangered" because of small geographic range, fragmented distribution within that range, and habitat loss. The species was collected for the first time in 1901. After more than a century no individuals were ever discovered again until recently in 2015, a discovery was made by an Algerian zoological team (D. Boualem, 2016).

References

Further reading
Doumergue F (1901). Essai sur la faune erpétologique de l'Oranie avec des tableaux analytiques et des notations pour la détermination de tous les reptiles et batraciens du Maroc, de l'Algérie et de la Tunisie. Oran: L. Fouque. 104 pp. + Plates I-XXVII. (Acanthodactylus pardalis var. spinicauda, new variation, pp. 169–173 + Plate XI, Figures 6–9). (in French).
Salvador, Alfredo (1982). "A revision of the lizards of the genus Acanthodactylus (Sauria: Lacertidae)". Bonner Zoologische Monographien (16): 1–167. (Acanthodactylus spinicauda, pp. 97–101, Figures 53–56, Map 20a). (in English, with an abstract in German).

Acanthodactylus
Endemic fauna of Algeria
Reptiles described in 1901
Taxa named by François Doumergue
Taxonomy articles created by Polbot